When Abortion Was Illegal: Untold Stories is a 1992 American short documentary film directed by Dorothy Fadiman. It was nominated for an Academy Award for Best Documentary Short.   The film consists of first person stories which reveal the physical, emotional and legal consequences of having or providing an abortion when it was a criminal act. The film is the first of three films called the Reproductive Rights Trilogy or "From the Back Alleys to the Supreme Court & Beyond."

Of making the film, Dorothy Fadiman said, "While a student at Stanford, I had become unintentionally pregnant. I had no money, no committed partner and my family was 3,000 miles away. I could neither find or afford a skilled provider. Abortion was illegal in California (1962), so I paid $600 to a person whose face I never saw to terminate my pregnancy. I was blindfolded throughout the procedure. Soon afterward, I began to hemorrhage and ended up on the intensive care ward of Stanford hospital with a fever of 105. I could have died, like so many women who risked the back alleys or aborted themselves. In 1973, a Supreme Court decision affirmed that most abortions would be legal. 1991, now a documentary filmmaker, I realized that some members of the Supreme Court were so anti-abortion that they could vote to overturn Roe v. Wade. Most people had no idea what the dangers of the back alleys had been. I decided to make a documentary based on what had happened to me, and to so many other women. This film became the first of three in my trilogy From the Back Alleys to the Supreme Court & Beyond."

References

External links
The Power of Choice Project films

When Abortion Was Illegal: Untold Stories at Bullfrog Films
Film Review from PersephoneMagazine.com, Nov 2011

1992 films
1992 short films
1992 documentary films
American independent films
Documentary films about abortion
Films directed by Dorothy Fadiman
American short documentary films
1990s English-language films
1990s American films